Jimi: All Is by My Side is a 2013 internationally co-produced biographical drama film about Jimi Hendrix, written and directed by John Ridley. The film tells the story of Hendrix's career beginnings, through his arrival in London, the creation of The Jimi Hendrix Experience and the beginning of his fame prior to his performance at the Monterey Pop Festival. It was screened in the Special Presentation section at the 2013 Toronto International Film Festival and at the South by Southwest film festival and was released in the UK on 8 August 2014. The film screened at the New Zealand International Film Festival (NZIFF) on 26 July 2014.

Cast

Production
The film does not include any songs written by Hendrix, as the filmmakers' request to use them was denied by Experience Hendrix LLC (Hendrix's estate). Instead, the film set in London in 1966 and 1967 includes the songs that Hendrix performed during those years, shortly before the release of his debut album, Are You Experienced. All musical parts were played by Waddy Wachtel (guitar), Leland Sklar (bass), Kenny Aronoff (drums). Wachtel wrote short segments of music for the film that sound similar to the Experience's early songs.

Reception

Box office
John Ridleys's All Is by My Side has grossed $340,911 in the United States and Canada and $586,163 in other territories for a worldwide total of $927,074, plus $67,173 with home video sales, against a production budget of $5 million.

Critical response
Jimi: All Is by My Side received a rating of 67% on review aggregator Rotten Tomatoes, with an average rating of 6/10 based on 83 reviews. The site's consensus states: "It's uneven—and it lacks the primal power of its subject's classic recordings—but Jimi: All Is By My Side offers a well-acted alternative take on the Hendrix myth." On Metacritic, the film has a rating of 66 out of 100, based on 27 critics, indicating "generally favorable reviews". On its release, Kathy Etchingham, who was not consulted during production, strongly criticised the film's dramatization of her relationship with Hendrix, describing it as "absolute nonsense".

References

External links
 
  (rating 3.5/5)

2013 films
2013 drama films
2013 biographical drama films
Irish biographical drama films
British biographical drama films
English-language Irish films
Biographical films about musicians
Films set in the 1960s
Films directed by John Ridley
Films with screenplays by John Ridley
Cultural depictions of Jimi Hendrix
Cultural depictions of the Rolling Stones
Cultural depictions of the Beatles
2010s English-language films
2010s British films